Maria Sakellaridou (born 29 April 1981) is a Greek rower. She competed in the women's lightweight double sculls event at the 2004 Summer Olympics.

References

1981 births
Living people
Greek female rowers
Olympic rowers of Greece
Rowers at the 2004 Summer Olympics
Rowers from Thessaloniki